Georges Leenheere (born 21 November 1919) was a Belgian water polo player. He competed at the 1948 Summer Olympics and the 1952 Summer Olympics.

References

External links
  

1919 births
Possibly living people
Belgian male water polo players
Olympic water polo players of Belgium
Water polo players at the 1948 Summer Olympics
Water polo players at the 1952 Summer Olympics
Sportspeople from Brussels
20th-century Belgian people